Hampton Charles may refer to:

 Hampton Charles, Herefordshire 
 Hampton Charles, pseudonym of Roy Peter Martin writing three of the Miss Seeton mysteries

See also
 Charles Hampton (disambiguation)